Pim van Liemt (born 22 March 1964) is a Dutch cricket umpire  and former cricketer, who serves as a member of the ICC Associate and Affiliate International Umpires Panel. He was shortlisted as the Koninklijke Nederlandse Cricket Bond Umpire of the Year in 2014, and won the award in 2015. He umpired in the 2016 ICC World Cricket League Division Five. In his playing career, van Liemt played one match for Netherlands U-19 against Bermuda U-19; opening the batting, van Liemt scored 20. He stood as an umpire at the 2018 ICC Women's World Twenty20 Qualifier.

On 13 June 2018, he stood in his first Twenty20 International (T20I) match, between the Netherlands and Ireland. On 21 June 2019, he stood in his first One Day International (ODI) match, between the Netherlands and Zimbabwe.

See also
 List of One Day International cricket umpires
 List of Twenty20 International cricket umpires

References

External links
 CricketArchive 

1964 births
Living people
Dutch cricket umpires
Dutch One Day International cricket umpires
Dutch Twenty20 International cricket umpires